The Semme is a  river in the Creuse and Haute-Vienne departments, in central France. Its source is in Saint-Priest-la-Feuille. It flows generally west and is  a right tributary of the Gartempe, into which it flows near le Bouchard, a hamlet in the municipality of Droux.

Departments and communes along its course
This list is ordered from source to mouth: 
Creuse: Saint-Priest-la-Feuille, Saint-Pierre-de-Fursac, Saint-Maurice-la-Souterraine
Haute-Vienne: Fromental, Saint-Amand-Magnazeix, Bessines-sur-Gartempe, Châteauponsac, Villefavard, Rancon, Droux

References

Rivers of France
Rivers of Creuse
Rivers of Haute-Vienne
Rivers of Nouvelle-Aquitaine